Tenglo Island is separated from Puerto Montt by the Tenglo Channel in Reloncaví Sound, Los Lagos Region, Chile.

See also
 List of islands of Chile

External links 
 Tenglo Island
 Tenglo Travel

Islands of Los Lagos Region
Puerto Montt
Coasts of Los Lagos Region